The Homelessness Reduction Act 2017 is an Act of the Parliament of the United Kingdom. It amends the Housing Act 1996. The Act started as a Private Member's Bill introduced by Conservative Member of Parliament for Harrow East Bob Blackman.

Blackman was drawn second in the 2016 annual Parliamentary ballot for a Private Member's Bill and put together the bill in partnership with national homelessness charity, Crisis. It was the first Private Member's Bill to be supported by a select committee. After receiving Government support at second reading, it passed through all stages in Parliament unopposed in both Houses and received Royal Assent on 27 April 2017.

See also
Homelessness in England

References

External links
Homelessness Reduction Bill 2016-17

Homelessness and law
Homelessness in England